"All the Pretty Girls" is a song written by Nicolle Galyon, Tommy Lee James, and Josh Osborne and recorded by American country music artist Kenny Chesney, released on June 5, 2017 as the fourth and final single from Chesney's seventeenth studio album Cosmic Hallelujah (2016).

Commercial performance
As of October 2017, the song has sold 110,000 copies in the United States.

Music video
The accompanying music video for this song was directed and produced by William Renner and Jessica Martinez and premiered on CMT, GAC and Vevo in August 2017.

Charts

Year-end charts

Certifications

References

2016 songs
2017 singles
Kenny Chesney songs
Songs written by Nicolle Galyon
Songs written by Tommy Lee James
Songs written by Josh Osborne
Song recordings produced by Buddy Cannon
Columbia Nashville Records singles
Columbia Records singles